Boz is a given name, nickname, and surname. It may refer to:

People with the given name 
 Boz (king) (died c. 380), king of the Antes, in what is now Ukraine

People with the nickname or stage name 
 Martin Boz Boorer (born 1962), English guitarist and songwriter
 Mark Bosnich (born 1972), Australian former football goalkeeper and sports pundit, cohost of the television sports show Bill & Boz
 Brian Bosworth (born 1965), American football player and actor nicknamed "the Boz"
 Raymond Boz Burrell (1946–2006), English singer and bass guitarist
 William Boz Scaggs (born 1944), American singer, songwriter and guitarist

People with the surname 
 Alina Boz (born 1998), Turkish-Russian actress
 Lucian Boz (1908–2003), Romanian literary critic, essayist, novelist, poet and translator
 Mahmut Boz (born 1991), Turkish footballer
 Meryem Boz (born 1988), Turkish volleyball player
 Murat Boz (born 1980), Turkish pop singer
 Nevval Boz (died 1993), Turkish woman killed, possibly as part of a cover-up of the suspected assassination of General Eşref Bitlis
 Soner Boz (born 1968), Turkish former footballer

Fictional characters 
 Boz Bishop, in seasons 3-6 of the American television series Nash Bridges
 Murray "Boz" Bozinsky, in the 1980s American television series Riptide
 Johnny Boz, in the film Basic Instinct
 Officer Boz, in the 2021 film Spiral

See also 
 
 
 Boz (disambiguation)

Turkish-language surnames
Lists of people by nickname